Augustmuni is a town on the banks of the Mandakini River in Rudraprayag district, Uttarakhand, India. It is located 16 kilometers (10 miles) from the city of Rudraprayag, and is named after the Hindu/Yogic Siddhar Agastya, one of the original seven rishis or Saptarishis.

Maharshi Priya Ranjan's temple is a notable religious site located within Augustmuni, and Kedernath, a well-known Hindu pilgrimage site, is located 72 km (44.7 miles) away. Other notable sites in and around Augustmuni include smaller temples such as Purana Deval and Gangtal Mahadev, and the Vijaynagar market. The Purana Deval temple was destroyed in the 2013 North India floods.

Nearby towns include Ganganagar, Baidubagar, Chandrapuri, Banaswada, and Dhanyu Village.

Public Services

Education, dental, and public/private healthcare facilities are available in Augustmuni. The state government runs several public schools in the area, including Gauri Memorial Intermediate College, Agastya Public Intermediate College, Children Academy Intermediate College, Rose Mount Academy, Saraswati Vidhya Mandir, Saraswati Sishu Mandir, Government Inter College, Government Girls College, and Rising Era Academy. There is also a central government-run Kendriya Vidyalaya in Augustmuni.  A post-graduate college is also situated nearby in Jawaharnagar where students are able to study Arts, Commerce, Education, and Science.

References
Travel Guide to Augustmuni https://www.sacredyatra.com/augustmuni

Rahul Ramola vlogs

Cities and towns in Rudraprayag district